Iberg Castle is a partly ruined castle in Wattwil in the canton of St. Gallen in Switzerland.

Castle site
Iberg Castle is located south-west of the town of Wattwil.  The central keep is six stories tall and has an entrance on the north-west corner.  The keep is surrounded by a curtain wall.  The castle hill is protected by moats and some walls.

History
Iberg Castle was built in 1240 by Heinrich von Iberg who was a vassal of the Prince-Abbot of St. Gallen.  The castle was briefly conquered in 1249 following the Toggenburg fratricide and again in 1290 during the rule of the anti-Abbot Konrad von Gundelfingen in St. Gallen.   It was damaged during the Appenzell Wars in 1405 and soon thereafter rebuilt.  During the conflicts leading to the Battles of Villmergen (from 1699 to 1712), the castle was besieged in 1710.  After the Treaty of Baden in 1718 it was given back to the Abbot.

During the suppression of the monasteries in 1805, the castle became privately owned.  Some of the housing was demolished in 1835, but the roof and battlements were rebuilt in 1902 and 1965 by the municipality.

See also
 List of castles and fortresses in Switzerland

References

Castles in the canton of St. Gallen
Ruined castles in Switzerland